Carrie White is the title character of Stephen King's 1974 horror novel Carrie and its adaptations.

Carrie White may also refer to:

Carrie White (hairdresser) (20th–21st century), American hairdresser

See also
Clarrie White, footballer
Kerry White, politician